Procollagen C-endopeptidase enhancer 1 is an enzyme that in humans is encoded by the PCOLCE gene.

Fibrillar collagen types I-III are synthesized as precursor molecules known as procollagens. These precursors contain amino- and carboxyl-terminal peptide extensions known as N- and C-propeptides, respectively, which are cleaved, upon secretion of procollagen from the cell, to yield the mature triple helical, highly structured fibrils. This gene encodes a glycoprotein which binds and drives the enzymatic cleavage of type I procollagen and heightens  activity.

References

Further reading